The Electronic Journal of Knowledge Management (EJKM) is a peer-reviewed academic journal that contributes to the development of both theory and practice in the field of knowledge management and provides perspectives on topics relevant to the study, implementation, and management of knowledge management.  It accepts academic papers, topical articles and case studies dealing with  the research in, and practice of, knowledge management.

See also
Journal of Knowledge Management
Journal of Knowledge Management Practice

Knowledge management journals
Publications established in 2003
Online-only journals